The lighthouse lizardfish (Synodus jaculum)  is a species of lizardfish that lives mainly in the Indo-Pacific.

Information
The lighthouse lizardfish is known to live in a marine environment within a depth range of about 2–100 meters. They are native to reef-associated locations within a tropical climate. The average length of the Synodus jaculum as an unsexed male is about 10 centimeters or 3.9 inches. The maximum recorded length of the Synodus jaculum as an unsexed male is about 20 centimeters or 7.87 inches. This species is identified by its brown colored body with the dark brown splotches. This species also has transparent fins. The lighthouse lizardfish is native to the areas of Indo-Pacific, East Africa, Marquesan, Society islands, north to the Izu Islands in Japan, south to New South Wales in Australia, Palau, and Kosrae in Micronesia.  This species occupies coral reefs and it is found on sand or rubble near coral heads. This species of fish is caught and sold as fresh and salted in markets. It is also common to find this species isolated, in pairs, or in small groups.

Etymology
The specific epithet of the species, jaculum, is the Latin word for javelin, in reference to the peculiar behaviour this species has of launching itself off the bottom and swimming in midwater for prolonged periods.

Common names
The common names for the Synodus jaculum from different languages is as follows:
French : Anoli phare
English : Black-tailed lizardfish
English : Blackblotch lizardfish
English : Blacktail lizardfish 
English : Javelinfish
Spanish : Lagarto faro
Japanese : Oguro-eso
Portuguese : Peixe-banana faroleiro

Classification
The taxonomic classification of the Synodus jaculum is as follows:
Kingdom : Animalia  	
Phylum : Chordata  
Class : Actinopterygii  
Order : Aulopiformes  
Family : Synodontidae  
Genus : Synodus  
Species : Synodus jaculum

References

Notes

External links
 

Synodontidae
Taxa named by Barry C. Russell
Taxa named by Roger Frank Cressey Jr.
Fish described in 1979